Anatoliy Mykolayovych Molotay (1 November 1937 – 7 September 2022) was a Soviet-Ukrainian professional football coach and player.

Molotay was a product of an old Kyivan club Lokomotyv.

At 20 Molotay was representing the team of Oktyabrskyi Raion of the Kyiv City (later known as SC Temp Kyiv) at republican competitions of KFK.

In 1958 on the initiative of the director of Southwestern Railway Petro Kryvonos, in Vinnytsia was established another Lokomotyv club and Molotay became one of the first players of the club, with which he stayed until 1964. In 1962 he also defended colors of Kolhospnyk Cherkasy. Molotay was forced into early retirement due to a bad injury.

After retirement, Molotay was invited to coach junior players at the Dynamo's Kyiv academy. Later in 1970s he became a manager of several third-tier football clubs such as Bukovyna and Kolhospnyk. In 1983 along with Viktor Kanevsky Molotay stood at the creation of a new FC Dynamo Irpin out of the Kyivan suburbs.

Soon after Ukraine gained its independence, Molotay became a match inspector for the Football Federation of Ukraine (today Ukrainian Association of Football).

References

External links
 

1937 births
2022 deaths
Sportspeople from Khmelnytskyi, Ukraine
Soviet footballers
Association football midfielders
FC Temp Kyiv players
FC Nyva Vinnytsia players
FC Dnipro Cherkasy players
Soviet football managers
Ukrainian football managers
FC Bukovyna Chernivtsi managers
FC Dnipro Cherkasy managers
FC Ros Bila Tserkva managers
FC Antratsyt Kirovske
Football Federation of Ukraine officials